Zealand at 7,031 km2 is the largest and most populous island in Denmark proper (thus excluding Greenland and Disko Island, which are larger in size). Zealand had a population of 2,319,705 on 1 January 2020.

It is the 13th-largest island in Europe by area and the 4th most populous. It is connected to Sprogø and Funen by the Great Belt Fixed Link and to Amager by several bridges in Copenhagen. Indirectly, through the island of Amager and the Øresund Bridge, it is also linked to Scania in Sweden. In the south, the Storstrøm Bridge and the Farø Bridges connect it to Falster, and beyond that island to Lolland, from where the Fehmarnbelt Tunnel to Germany is planned.

Copenhagen, the capital of Denmark, with a population between 1.3 and 1.4 million people in 2020, is located mostly on the eastern shore of Zealand and partly on the island of Amager. Other cities on Zealand include Roskilde, Hillerød, Næstved, Helsingør, Slagelse, Køge, Holbæk and Kalundborg.

Administratively, Zealand is divided between two Danish regions: The Copenhagen metropolitan area and North Zealand belong to the Capital Region, while the major and more rural part of the island belongs to the Zealand Region.

Etymology
The origin of the Danish name Sjælland is not exactly known.  in modern Danish means "soul"; a derivation from / (meaning "lake" or "sea") has been assumed. However, today a common hypothesis is that the Old Danish form  is based on the word * with the ending *wundia-. The latter means "indicates, resembles". The word * may have two different meanings: "seal" (in modern Danish ) or "deep bay, fjord". Since Roskilde is a major and ancient settlement on Zealand, accessible by sea through the narrow Roskilde Fjord (branched from the Isefjord), it has been assumed that the sailors named the island after this.

The English form may be borrowed from the German form Seeland. These forms might be based on the assumption that the first part means sea or lake (German See), or they could simply be based on an alternative Danish form of the name, Sælland, which was common until the 19th century.

Unlike the Danish island, the Pacific nation of New Zealand is named after the Dutch province of Zeeland.

History
The tribal Danes came from Zealand and Scania and spoke an early form of North Germanic. Historians believe that before their arrival, most of Jutland and the nearest islands were settled by tribal Jutes. The Jutes migrated to Great Britain eventually, some as mercenaries of Brythonic King Vortigern, and were granted the south-eastern territories of Kent, the Isle of Wight and other areas, where they settled. They were later absorbed or ethnically cleansed by the invading Angles and Saxons, who formed the Anglo-Saxons. The remaining Jutish population in Jutland assimilated in with the settling Danes.

Valdemar's Zealandic Law governed was a civil code enacted in the 13th century. Prior to the adoption of the Jutlandic, Zealandic and the Scanian laws, there had been no uniformity of laws throughout settlements in Denmark. Ringsted and later Roskilde were the first important political and religious centres on the island, a role later taken over by Copenhagen. Other important religious centres prior to the Reformation were Sorø Abbey at Sprø and Esrom Abbey at Rsrum. With its strategic location at the entrance to the Øresund, especially after the construction of Kronborg Castle and the introduction of Sound Dues, Helsingør would later develop into the most important town and seaport outside Copenhagen.

Most of North Zealand was for centuries, starting in the late 16th century, owned by the crown and used mainly as a royal hunting domain. Local manors played a central role in the economy on the rest of the island.

Early industrial centres outside Copenhagen included Mølleåen with its watermills, the Kronborg Arms Factory at Hellebæk, Johan Frederik Classen's Frederick's Works at Frederiksværk and Niels Ryberg's Køng Textile Factory at Vordingborg. Substantial parts of the southernmost part of the island was in the 18th century part of Vordingborg Cavalry District.

The first railways on the island were constructed by Det Sjællandske Jernbaneselskab (1847-1888). The first section opened between Copenhagen and Roskilde in 1847.

Mythological origins

In Norse mythology as told in the Gylfaginning, the island was created by the goddess Gefjun after she tricked Gylfi, the king of Sweden. She removed a piece of land and transported it to Denmark, which became Zealand. The vacant area was filled with water and became Mälaren. However, since modern maps show a similarity between Zealand and the Swedish lake Vänern, it is sometimes identified as the hole left by Gefjun. Gefjun is queen of King Skjöldr, eponymous ancestor of the Scyldings, related to the etymological debate.

Geography

Zealand is the most populous Danish island. It is irregularly shaped, and is north of the islands of Lolland, Falster, and Møn. The small island of Amager lies immediately east.

Copenhagen is mostly on Zealand but extends across northern Amager. A number of bridges and the Copenhagen Metro connect Zealand to Amager, which is connected to Scania in Sweden by the Øresund Bridge via the artificial island of Peberholm. Zealand is joined in the west to Funen, by the Great Belt Fixed Link, and Funen is connected by bridges to the country's mainland, Jutland.

Zealand gives its name to the Selandian era of the Paleocene.

Cities and towns
Urban areas with 10,000+ inhabitants:

See also
North Zealand
New Zealand

References

External links

 
Geography of Copenhagen
Islands of Denmark